"Dear..." is an album from Sachi Tainaka that was released on March 7, 2007. It reached the 33rd place on the Oricon Weekly Albums Chart.

Its catalog number is GNCX-1002.

Track listing
プロローグ ～Trust you～
最高の片想い
笑顔が戻ってきた!!!
Cry
それでも
アリの夢
独り占めしたい
Happy Song
会いたいよ。
Symphony of Fate disillusion～きらめく涙は星に
mother

References

2007 albums
Sachi Tainaka albums